{{DISPLAYTITLE:C10H9NO3S}}
The molecular formula C10H9NO3S (molar mass: 223.25 g/mol, exact mass: 223.0303 u) may refer to:

 Aminonaphthalenesulfonic acids
 Naphthionic acid
 Tobias acid (2-amino-1-naphthalenesulfonic acid)